Squee may refer to:

 Squee!, a comic book series
 Squee (character), main character of the series
 Squee Allen, ice hockey player
 Squee, an animal seen in the computer game Myst III: Exile
 Squee, the death rattle of a robot in the Magnus: Robot Fighter comic
 Squee, a character in the Magic: The Gathering trading card game
 Squee, an affectionate nickname for President of Ireland, Michael D. Higgins

See also
Squeal (disambiguation)
Squealer (disambiguation)